Tingsha (or ting-sha) are small cymbals used in prayer and rituals by Tibetan Buddhist practitioners. Two cymbals are joined together by a leather strap or chain. The cymbals are struck together producing a clear and high pitched tone. Typical sizes range from 2.5–4 inches in diameter. Tingsha are very thick and produce a unique long ringing tone. Antique tingsha were made from special bronze alloys that produce harmonic overtones.

In high quality tingsha, both cymbals will match—the tones are identical or nearly identical. Most tingsha, however, are not perfectly matched so each produces a distinctly different tone. This is due to modern manufacturing processes in which many tingsha are produced at the same time and then poorly matched. Fine quality examples of antiques or the rare pair of carefully matched new tingsha will sound identical.

Antique tingsha are rare and quite expensive. Sometimes two cymbals that do not match are paired together. Single cymbals are often sold with a bone or piece of wood attached, so the instrument is still functional even though the mating cymbal has been lost.

Tingsha are unique in form and function and distinctly different from Indian, Nepali, Chinese, Turkish or other cymbals.

Today, tingsha are used along with singing bowls and other instruments in meditation, music and sound healing. Artists such as Karma Moffett and Perteson Meneses, Joseph Feinstein use multiple pairs of antique tingsha together to create a sonic tapestry effect.

Traditionally, however, tingsha are used as part of specific Tibetan rituals, such as offerings to "hungry ghosts." While they are commonly found today in musical recordings and yoga classes, their real function is as a religious ritual tool.

See also
 Crotales
 Iron in mythology
 Karatalas
 Shang
 Singing bowl
 Zill

References

External links
Link is broken.
Babel Audio has Tingsha sound samples for download

Buddhist ritual implements
Cymbals
Tibetan musical instruments